Robert Beveridge (24 June 1877 – 11 October 1901) was a Scottish footballer who played as a centre forward in the Football League for Everton and Nottingham Forest.

He came into consideration for an international cap at the age of 20 while with Third Lanark, taking part in one of the trial matches in 1898, but this did not lead on to selection for Scotland. He died of phthisis pulmonalis (tuberculosis) aged 24.

References

1877 births
1901 deaths
Scottish footballers
Footballers from Glasgow
People from Gorbals
English Football League players
Scottish Football League players
Scottish Junior Football Association players
Association football forwards
Maryhill Harp F.C. players
Third Lanark A.C. players
Nottingham Forest F.C. players
Everton F.C. players
20th-century deaths from tuberculosis
Tuberculosis deaths in Scotland